Streptomyces orinoci is a bacterium species from the genus of Streptomyces which has been isolated from soil. Streptomyces orinoci produces the antibiotics  spectinabilin, neoantimycin, neoaureothin and ochramycin.

See also 
 List of Streptomyces species

References

Further reading

External links
Type strain of Streptomyces orinoci at BacDive -  the Bacterial Diversity Metadatabase	

orinoci
Bacteria described in 1991